Ronald John MacDonald (September 19, 1874 - September 3, 1947) was a Canadian runner and winner of the second Boston Marathon in 1898.

Early life
MacDonald was born in Fraser's Grant, Antigonish County, Nova Scotia. His father died at sea when MacDonald was twelve years old, after which his mother relocated the family to Cambridgeport, Massachusetts, where relatives were living. MacDonald worked as a telephone lineman for the New England Telephone and Telegraph Company, and later in the family lunch store on Cambridge Street. In 1895, he joined the Cambridgeport Gymnasium Association with his brother Alexander. In 1897, he enrolled at Boston College as a special student.

First marathon 
On April 19, 1898, Ronald MacDonald joined 25 other runners in Ashland at the start line of the Boston Marathon. It was his first marathon and he raced in bicycle shoes. MacDonald ran the race conservatively waiting for the leaders to fall off the pace. Till the half-way mark, he raced 2- behind the leaders, then he started pushing the pace. He chased Hamilton Gray, the New York cross-country champion, through the downhills in the later part of the race and passed him in the last couple of miles. MacDonald ran the whole way without taking any fluids. MacDonald and Gray shook hands after the race.

Olympic representation 
Ronald MacDonald represented Canada at the 1900 Olympic Summer Games held in Paris, France.  MacDonald ran the marathon, but finished the last of 7 finishers.  He complained that the top 3 runners, who were French, had cut the course, and that only he and an American actually completed the whole course.

Return to Boston 
In 1901, MacDonald returned to the Boston Marathon with confidence stating that he would win and break the record of Jack Caffery, another Canadian, who had run 2:39:44 the previous year.  MacDonald joined 37 other runners that day and ran as part of the top 4 for most of the race.  Unfortunately, MacDonald was seized with cramps and had to retire from the race, reported to be due to a sponge soaked with chloroform he unknowingly accepted from a spectator.

MacDonald returned to the Boston Marathon in 1902.  He and Sammy Mellor were favoured; MacDonald had finished 10 seconds faster than Mellor in the previous year’s Thanksgiving Day  Around-the-Bay Race in Hamilton, Ontario.  MacDonald and Mellor ran side by side in Boston until the 12th mile.  Unfortunately, after the half-way mark, in the Newton Hills, MacDonald had difficulties, walked for a while and retired from the race, which was won by Mellor in a time of 2:43:12.

In 1905, MacDonald was a handler for Boston Marathon runner Robert Fowler who ended up finishing in 3rd.  Fowler blamed his handlers (presumably including MacDonald) for advising him to stay with Olympic gold medalist Tom Hicks who ended up having a bad day.

Enrollment in university 

MacDonald returned to Nova Scotia in 1901 where he enrolled at St. Francis Xavier University in Antigonish as a pre-med student.  He continued winning many races and setting Canadian and World Records.  In 1902, he organized the first indoor meet ever held in Eastern Canada.  MacDonald also raced in the meet, winning the  race in a time of 15:38, a new Canadian indoor record, and defeating John Lorden, a teammate from the Cambridgeport Gymnasium Association who would win the Boston Marathon a year later.  In 1903, he beat the winner of the 1899 Boston Marathon, Lawrence Brignolia, in a  race.  Later that year, he entered medical school at Tufts Medical College, graduating in 1907. After a year of postgraduate work at Harvard University, he accepted a position as a general practice physician in the Port au Port Peninsula of Newfoundland and he would become a successful doctor practicing there and in Nova Scotia.

On August 18, 1909, Ronald MacDonald raced and won his last marathon in St. John’s, Newfoundland against his former teammate John Lorden on a six-lap-to-the-mile track at St. Bonaventure's College before 3,000 spectators. MacDonald was four laps behind at the twenty mile mark when Lorden "hit the wall." At the end, MacDonald finished 40 yards and ten seconds ahead of Lorden, in a time of 3:07:50 over 25 miles (40 km). MacDonald wrote one of the first books on running, How to Train and Win a Marathon Race.

MacDonald lived and practiced on the Port au Port Peninsula for thirty years. When the limestone quarry at Aguathuna opened up, he accepted a position as doctor for the workers at the facility. In 1913 he married Ada Pieroway of St. Georges, Newfoundland, and they had five children. In 1938 he returned to Antigonish with his family to retire; he had gained a lot of weight due to diabetes, and his health had deteriorated. In 1942 he suffered a severe stroke; five years later he died at Antigonish. He is buried at Heatherton, Nova Scotia, a short distance from his birthplace.

MacDonald was part of the original inductees in the Nova Scotia Sports Hall of Fame for Track and Field in 1979.

Records

 Winner of 135 prizes for running
 Winner of 1st Newton  handicap run - 1896
 Winner of 7-Mile U.S. Cross-country Championship – 1897
 Second in the N. E. A. A. A. U. championship  run – 1897
 Winner – Newton  handicap race - 1898
 Winner –  New England Championship - 1898
 World Record in 11-Mile Cross-country – 1898
 Winner B.A.A.  Cross-country – 1898
 Winner 2nd Boston Marathon – 2:42 – 1898
 Canadian Record – 
 Canadian Record – 
 World Record – indoor 
 Winner St. John’s Marathon - 1909

See also
List of winners of the Boston Marathon

Notes 
1. The date of birth is obtained from the record of birth registrations compiled by the Government of Nova Scotia. Elsewhere -- specifically on his 1898 petition for US naturalization and also on his headstone -- the birth date is given as September 27, 1874. On his death certificate it is stated as September 27, 1875.

References
Specific

General
 "Antigonish Fun Facts" Antigonish Regional Development Authority. http://www.antigonishrda.ns.ca/tour-antigonish-fun-facts.htm
 Boston Athletic Association ( and )
 Boston Sunday Journal, May 1, 1898
 Canadian Broadcasting Corporation (2004) (http://www.cbc.ca/olympics/2004/1900.html)
 Derderian, Tom (1994) Boston Marathon, Human Kinetics: Champaign, IL, pp. 8–10, 18-24, 31-35.
 Nova Scotia Sports Hall of Fame (http://www.novascotiasporthalloffame.com/inductee_view_lg.cfm?InducteeID=187)

External links 

1874 births
1947 deaths
Canadian male long-distance runners
Canadian male marathon runners
Boston Marathon male winners
Olympic track and field athletes of Canada
Athletes (track and field) at the 1900 Summer Olympics
People from Antigonish, Nova Scotia
Canadian people of Scottish descent
Canadian expatriate sportspeople in the United States
Sportspeople from Nova Scotia
Nova Scotia Sport Hall of Fame inductees